Theunissen is a small town that has the only wine estate, the Theunissen Wine Farm, in the Free State province of South Africa. It is located about 95 kilometers northeast of Bloemfontein and about 45 kilometers south of Welkom on the R30 road. It was founded by Boer War Commandant Helgaardt Theunissen.   

Theunissen has a small community (mostly farmers and miners) which supports the local businesses.

Geographic Location

Populated places in the Masilonyana Local Municipality
Populated places established in 1907

References